The Fezzan-Ghadames Military Territory was a territory in the southern part of Italian Libya which was occupied and administered by Free France from 1943 until Libya gained independence in 1951. It was part of the allied occupation of Libya.

Free French forces from French Chad occupied the area that was the former Italian Southern Military Territory in 1943, and made several requests to annex Fezzan administratively to France's North African possessions.

Fezzan joined Tripolitania and Cyrenaica to form the Kingdom of Libya on 24 December 1951. It was the first country to achieve independence through the United Nations and one of the first former European possessions in Africa to gain independence.

Notes

20th century in Libya
Aftermath of World War II in France
France–Libya relations
Fezzan
History of Fezzan
1943 establishments in the French colonial empire
States and territories established in 1943
States and territories disestablished in 1951